This article is about the phonology and phonetics of the Upper Sorbian language.

Vowels
The vowel inventory of Upper Sorbian is exactly the same as that of Lower Sorbian. It is also very similar to the vowel inventory of Slovene.

 Word-initial vowels are rare, and are often preceded by a non-phonemic glottal stop , or sometimes .  never appear in word-initial position, whereas  appear in word-initial position only in recent borrowings.
  is mid-centralized to  after hard consonants.
  has three allophones:
 Open-mid  between hard consonants and after a hard consonant;
 Mid  between soft consonants and after a soft consonant (excluding  in both cases);
 Diphthong with a mid onset  before .
  has two allophones:
 Diphthong with a mid onset  before labial consonants;
 Open-mid  in all other cases.
 The  and  distinctions are weakened or lost in unstressed syllables.
  is phonetically central . It is somewhat higher  after soft consonants.

Consonants

  are bilabial, whereas  are labiodental.
  are strongly palatalized.
  is a somewhat velarized bilabial approximant , whereas  (the soft counterpart of ) is a strongly palatalized bilabial approximant .
  is very rare. Apart from loanwords, it occurs only in two Slavonic words: zełharny  'deceitful' and zełharnosć  'deceitfulness', both of which are derivatives of łhać  'to lie'. Usage of these words is typically restricted to the Bautzen dialect, as speakers of the Catholic dialect use łžeć  and its derivatives.
  are alveolar ,  is alveolo-palatal , whereas  are dental .
Among these, the palatalized  are extremely rare.
  are velar  in front of velar consonants.
  is very rare. In many cases, it merges with  into .
  are very rare.
 In most dialects,  are palato-alveolar. This is unlike Lower Sorbian, where these consonants are laminal retroflex (flat postalveolar)  (Lower Sorbian  does not have a voiced counterpart). Laminal retroflex realizations of  also occur in Upper Sorbian dialects spoken in some villages north of Hoyerswerda.
  are velar, whereas  are uvular.
  does not occur word-initially, whereas  does not occur word-finally.
 Soft  is strongly palatalized.
  is voiced , unlike Lower Sorbian where it is voiceless .
 An epenthetic  is inserted before a post-vocalic soft consonant, yielding a diphthong.
 In literary language, the contrast between hard and soft consonants is neutralized in word-final position. Word-finally, the letter  represents a post-vocalic sequence , as in dźeń  'day'.

Final devoicing and assimilation

Upper Sorbian has both final devoicing and regressive voicing assimilation, both word-internal and across word boundaries.

Stress

 Words consisting of up to three syllables are stressed on the first syllable.
 Foreign words, such as student  'student', preserve their original accent.

References

Bibliography

Further reading

 
 

Phonology
Slavic phonologies